Nicholas Ryan Fazekas (born June 17, 1985) is an American-born Japanese professional basketball player for the Kawasaki Brave Thunders of the B.League in Japan.

Early career
Fazekas attended Ralston Valley High School in Arvada, Colorado where he earned the statewide Mr. Basketball Colorado honor for the 2002–03 season along with being a two-time 4A classification player of the year. As a senior, he led the Mustangs to a 25–2 record and a state championship after an undefeated regular season and semi-finals appearance the previous year. During his high school career he wore number 22 and he continued to do so in college.

College career

Fazekas was signed by the University of Nevada for the 2003–04 season. From that point forward, Fazekas led the Wolf Pack to four straight NCAA Tournament appearances during his matriculation, including a run to the Sweet 16 as a freshman. He became the school's all-time leading scorer on November 18, 2006, when he surpassed the old record of 1,877 points scored by Edgar Jones in 1979. He also surpassed the single-season scoring record formerly set by Jones during the 2005–06 season. Fazekas also earned his third straight WAC Player of the Year for the 2006–07 season, a feat only matched by Utah's Keith Van Horn, for whom Fazekas was later coincidentally waived to make space on the trade that brought point guard Jason Kidd to the Mavericks.  On February 28, 2019, Nevada retired Fazekas' number 22 in a ceremony at halftime of a win over UNLV. Fazekas became the second Wolf Pack basketball player to have his number retired, after Edgar Jones.

Professional career

NBA career
Fazekas was an early entrant into the 2006 NBA Draft, however he did not hire an agent, allowing him to eventually remove himself from consideration in order to play one more year of college basketball. The next year, he was taken with the 34th pick in the 2007 NBA Draft by the Dallas Mavericks.

Fazekas was part of the Mavericks Summer League Team. He averaged 6.6 points and 4.4 rebounds while playing an average of 17 minutes a game. On July 26, the Mavericks signed Fazekas to a one-year contract. As part of the team's club policy, terms of the contract were not disclosed.

Fazekas was released by the Mavericks on February 19, 2008, to make room on the roster for Keith Van Horn, whose signing-and-trading was crucial to facilitate Dallas's trade for veteran point guard Jason Kidd from the New Jersey Nets. On February 27, 2008 he signed with the Clippers. However, on August 1, 2008, the Clippers withdrew their qualifying offer to Fazekas, leaving him as an unrestricted free agent. He was signed by the Denver Nuggets for training camp, but waived again on October 23, 2008.

He played for the Boston Celtics' 2009 Summer League team, leading the squad in scoring.

European career
After being waived by the Nuggets, Fazekas failed to find another home in NBA and decided to go overseas. On October 28, 2008, he signed with the Belgian team Base Oostende for the 2008–09 season. In January 2009, he left Base Oostende and joined the French Pro A club ASVEL Lyon-Villeurbanne
After a stint with the Celtics summer league team, Fazekas signed with JDA Dijon, returning to the French Pro A for the 2009 season.

NBA D-League
Fazekas was selected by the Reno Bighorns with the first overall pick of the 2010 NBA Development League Draft. He was waived by the Bighorns on December 30, 2010, but rejoined the team for the 2011–12 season. In December 2011, he was waived again due to injury.

Toshiba Brave Thunders

In 2012, Fazekas announced his move to Japan where he signed with the Toshiba Brave Thunders Kanagawa. Prior to that, he was a member of the San Miguel Beermen for the entire 2011 season. After his move, he led his team with 26.4 points and 13.5 rebounds, earning him an MVP award in 2012. He won the award again in 2013. In 2014, he led Toshiba Brave Thunders to an NBL Title by scoring 29 points which helped his team win 86–71 against Toyota Alvark in two periods. During the 2019–20 season, Fazekas averaged 23.1 points, 10.9 rebounds and 3.8 assists per game.

National team career 
In the 2019 FIBA World Cup, Fazekas played center for the Japan national basketball team, starting alongside power forward Rui Hachimura. In a preliminary match in Saitama, Fazekas  played extended minutes in Japan's first-ever FIBA victory over a European opponent, draining a corner three in the last 90 seconds to help Japan upset the visiting Germans.

Personal life
Fazekas's grandfather, Albert Fazekas, was a freedom fighter in the 1956 Hungarian Revolution who escaped from a Soviet-operated Hungarian prison after setting himself on fire to create a diversion. He soon emigrated with his wife and child to the United States. They would have two more children, one of them Nick's father Joe, after arriving in America. Joe, who is 6'10" (2.08 m) himself, briefly played professional basketball in Argentina after playing college ball at Wyoming and Idaho State. In an interview, Fazekas said that he would like to become a Hungarian citizen and play for the Hungary national basketball team.

Awards
Two-time 4A Player of the Year (2001–02, 2002–03)
Mr. Basketball-Colorado (2002–03)
Three-time WAC Player of the Year (2004–05, 2005–06, 2006–07)
Wooden Award Finalist (2005–06, 2006–07)
Third AP Team All-American (2005–06)
Second AP Team All-American (2006–07)
First team ESPN All-American (2006–07)
Joseph Kearney Award (2006)

NBA career statistics

Regular season

|-
| align="left" | 
| align="left" | Dallas
| 4 || 0 || 2.3 || .400 || .000 || .000 || .8 || .0 || .0 || .0 || 1.0
|-
| align="left" | 
| align="left" | L.A. Clippers
| 22 || 0 || 11.8 || .571 || .000 || .682 || 3.9 || .6|| .4 || .5 || 4.7'''
|-
| align="left" | Career
| align="left" | 
| 26 || 0 || 10.3 || .561 || .000 || .682 || 3.4 || .4 || .3 || .4 || 4.1

International statistics 

|-
| align="left" | 2012–13
| align="left" | Toshiba
|42 || 42|| 27.7 ||.545  || .333 ||.705 || 12.1 ||1.2 || .9 ||.8  || bgcolor="CFECEC"|21.5*
|-
|align="left"  style="background-color:#afe6ba; border: 1px solid gray" | 2013–14†
| align="left" | Toshiba
|54 || 54|| 30.5 ||.560  || .445 ||.756 ||bgcolor="CFECEC"| 13.5* ||2.1 || .8 ||1.7  || bgcolor="CFECEC"|26.4*
|-
| align="left" | 2014–15
| align="left" | Toshiba
|50 || 50|| 31.2 ||.571  || .401 ||.793 || 12.9 ||2.3 || 1.0 ||1.2  ||bgcolor="CFECEC"| 26.1*
|-
| align="left"  style="background-color:#afe6ba; border: 1px solid gray" | 2015–16†
| align="left" | Toshiba
|54 || 54|| 33.0 ||.536  || .370 ||.782 || bgcolor="CFECEC"|13.5* ||1.9 || 1.0 ||1.0  || 25.9
|-
| align="left" | 2016–17
| align="left" | Kawasaki
|60 || 60|| 30.3 ||.546  || .428 ||.815 || 12.7 ||2.4 || .8 ||.8  || bgcolor="CFECEC"|27.1*
|-
| align="left" | 2017–18
| align="left" | Kawasaki
|60 || 59|| 29.9 ||.553  || .446 ||.846 ||bgcolor="CFECEC"| 10.9* ||2.8 || 1.2 ||.4  || 25.3
|-
| align="left" | 2018–19
| align="left" | Kawasaki
|59 || 50|| 31.4 ||.514  || .383 ||.857 || 11.0 ||3.0 || 1.1 ||.4  || 22.1
|-
| align="left" | 2019-20
| align="left" | Kawasaki
|40 || 40|| 32.0 ||.514  || .419 ||.831 || 11.0 ||3.7 || 1.0 ||.4  || 23.2
|-
| align="left" | 2020–21
| align="left" | Kawasaki
|56 || 56|| 30.0 ||.534  || .441 ||.848 || 9.7 ||3.7 || .9 ||.3  || 20.7
|-
| align="left" | 2021–22
| align="left" | Kawasaki
|55 || 55|| 29.3 ||.541  || .420 ||.864 || 8.9 ||4.3 || 1.0 ||.3  || 19.7
|-

See also
 List of NCAA Division I men's basketball players with 2000 points and 1000 rebounds

References

External links

Official Nevada Bio
College Hoop Net's Profile
NBADraft.net Profile
Basketpedya.com Player Profile

1985 births
Living people
2019 FIBA Basketball World Cup players
All-American college men's basketball players
American expatriate basketball people in Belgium
American expatriate basketball people in France
American expatriate basketball people in Japan
American expatriate basketball people in the Philippines
American men's basketball players
American people of Hungarian descent
ASVEL Basket players
Basketball players from Colorado
BC Oostende players
Centers (basketball)
Dallas Mavericks draft picks
Dallas Mavericks players
Japanese men's basketball players
Japanese people of American descent
Japanese people of Hungarian descent
JDA Dijon Basket players
Kawasaki Brave Thunders players
Los Angeles Clippers players
Nevada Wolf Pack men's basketball players
People from Arvada, Colorado
Philippine Basketball Association imports
Power forwards (basketball)
Reno Bighorns players
San Miguel Beermen players
Sportspeople from the Denver metropolitan area
Tulsa 66ers players